Bernd Blobel (born October 1, 1947, in the city of Magdeburg, Germany) is a scientist recognized for his contributions to the field of health informatics. He is a professor at the Faculty of Medicine of the University of Regensburg, Germany, and visiting professor at the First Faculty of Medicine of the Charles University of Prague, Czech Republic. His main areas of research include electronic medical records, security, privacy and interoperability, information systems architectures in health, telemedicine and biomedicine, engineering, translational medicine, knowledge representation, and ontologies. He has received numerous recognitions for his scientific career, among which are: Fellow of the American College of Medical Informatics (ACMI) (2004), Fellow of HL7 International (2010), Fellow of the Australasian College of Health Informatics (ACHI) (2011), Honorary Fellow of the European Federation of Medical Informatics (EFMI) (2015), Inaugural Fellow of the International Academy of Health Sciences and Informatics (IAHSI) (2017), and Honorary Fellow of the EuroMISE Mentors Association, as well as Honorary Fellow of HL7 Germany and the Society for Biomedical Engineering and Medical Informatics of the Czech Republic. He is the author of more than 200 high-impact scientific articles, including the book Analysis, Design and Implementation of Secure and Interoperable Distributed Health Information Systems.

Biography
He was selected to be part of the First Special Class of Mathematics in the former German Democratic Republic, a program that aimed to train the most prominent scientists in the nation. He began his university studies at the Magdeburg Institute of Technology (now Otto von Guericke University Magdeburg) in 1964. He received university degrees and certificates in electronics (1971), computer science (1971), biocybernetics (1974), theoretical physics (1975), biometry and medical informatics (1985), and, theory of education (1989). He obtained a Ph.D. in Physics at the University of Magdeburg with a thesis entitled "About the mechanism of information processing and energy transformation in bio-receptors – a general and membrane structure related transducer model
" (1976) . Subsequently, he received a Habilitation (post-doctorate qualification as a university professor in Germany) in Environment and Medicine at Magdeburg Medical University with a postdoctoral thesis " Implications of physical environmental factors on health" (1981), as well as a Qualification in Medical Informatics at the University of Magdeburg with the postdoctoral thesis " Analysis and Design for Secure and Interoperable Distributed Health Information Systems" (2001).

He developed a large part of his research career within the borders of the former German Democratic Republic, at the Magdeburg University of Medicine (later at the University of Magdeburg, Faculty of Medicine). Blobel was Head of the Laboratory of Environmental Medicine (1974–81), Director of Information Technology (CIO) (1974-2004), Founder and Head of the Medical Informatics Group (1981–87), Founding Director of the Medical Informatics Department, Deputy Director / Acting Director for the Institute of Biometry and Medical Informatics at the Magdeburg University of Medicine (1987-2004). In 2004 he moved as Founder and Head of Health Telematics Group from the Fraunhofer Institute Integrated Circuits in Erlangen (2004–06). From 2006 until his retirement in 2012 he served as founder and director of the National eHealth Competence Center (eHCC) at the Regensburg University Hospital (the University of Regensburg, Faculty of Medicine).

International career 
 Co-Founder and Vice President of HL7 Germany (1993-2012).
 Co-Chair of the OMG Object Management Group Security Working Group (1996-2001)
 Co-chair of the Working Groups "Security" and "Personnel Management" as well as the International Council at HL7 International (1997-2014)
 Co-chair, Healthcare Chapter, IFIP / Unesco World IT Forum (WITFOR) (2001–04)
 Chair, CEN/ISSS eHealth Standardization Focus Group, Brussels, Belgium (2004–06)
Vice-Chair/Chair, Working Group “Security, Safety and Ethics” (1997-2014), Chair, Working Group “EHR” (2000–14), and Member of the Council of the European Federation for Medical Informatics (EFMI).
Vice President of the Working Group "Security in Health Information Systems" (1998-2004) 
 Member of the General Assembly of IMIA (2004–06) at the International Medical Informatics Association (IMIA)

Awards 
 Recipient of the German Federal Order of Merit

References 

German computer scientists
1947 births
Living people
Recipients of the Cross of the Order of Merit of the Federal Republic of Germany
Academic staff of Charles University